

This list of performers on Top of the Pops includes popular music recording artists and musical ensembles who have performed on Top of the Pops, a weekly BBC television programme that featured artists from the UK Singles Chart.

The BBC transmitted new installments of the programme weekly from January 1964 through July 2006, and from then on, only as Christmas and New Year Specials. It was also converted it into a radio programme (not included here).

Although several artists appeared multiple times on the show over the years, the list notes just their first appearance. This list also only comprises artists who performed in the show's studio, not video clips shown.

1964

1965

1966

1967

1968

1969

1970

1971

1972

1973

1974

1975

1976

1977

1978

1979

1980

1981

1982

1983

1984

1985

1986

1987

1988

1989

1990

1991

1992

1993

1994

1995

1996

1997

1998

1999

2000

2001

2002

2003

2004

2005

2006

2007

2008

2009

2010

2011

2012

2013

2014

2015

2016

2017

2018

2019

2020

2021

2022 
 Cat Burns (24 December)

See also 

List of performances on Top of the Pops
Top of the Pops 2

References

External links

Lists of bands
Lists of musicians
Performers